The 1925–26 Cincinnati Bearcats men's basketball team represented the University of Cincinnati during the 1925–26 NCAA men's basketball season. The head coach was Boyd Chambers, coaching his eighth season with the Bearcats. The team finished with an overall record of 17–2.

Schedule

|-

References

Cincinnati Bearcats men's basketball seasons
Cincinnati
Cincinnati Bearcats men's basketball team
Cincinnati Bearcats men's basketball team